Glipidiomorpha is a genus of beetles in the family Mordellidae, containing the following species:

 Glipidiomorpha astrolabii Franciscolo, 1952
 Glipidiomorpha atraterga Lu & Fan, 2000
 Glipidiomorpha burgeoni Píc, 1929
 Glipidiomorpha curticauda Ermisch, 1968
 Glipidiomorpha fahraei Maeklin, 1975
 Glipidiomorpha ideodorsalis Franciscolo, 1955
 Glipidiomorpha intermedia Franciscolo, 1955
 Glipidiomorpha kuatunensis Ermisch, 1968
 Glipidiomorpha leucozona Franciscolo, 1952
 Glipidiomorpha obsoleta Franciscolo, 1955
 Glipidiomorpha poggii Franciscolo, 2001
 Glipidiomorpha rhodesiensis Franciscolo, 1955
 Glipidiomorpha riesei Franciscolo, 2001
 Glipidiomorpha rufiterga Lu & Fan, 2000
 Glipidiomorpha rufobrunneipennis Ermisch, 1968
 Glipidiomorpha septentrionalis Franciscolo, 1994
 Glipidiomorpha testaceicornis Ermisch, 1955

References

Mordellidae